Muriel Amy Cornell (born Gunn; 27 September 1906 – 8 March 1996) was a British athlete and world record holder for the long jump.

Cornell was born in 1906 in Mitcham, then part of Surrey, to Frederick William Gunn and Beatrice Minnie, née Loosemore. She married Stanley Herbert Cornell, a brush manufacturer, in August 1928.

She became a founder member of the ladies' section of Mitcham Athletic Club in 1926 at the age of 19. At the British Games in London in August, she broke the long jump world record with a distance of 5.485 m. Later in August, she competed at the 1926 Women's World Games in Gothenburg at which she placed second, recording 5.44 m, behind Japan's Kinue Hitomi. Cornell exceeded Hitomi's world record jump of 5.5 m, but she left a mark in the sand after she turned to speak to an official before leaving the pit.

Cornell again became the world record holder in August 1927, jumping 5.575 m, which she held until Hitomi jumped 5.98 m in 1928. The long jump did not feature at the 1928 Summer Olympics, the first games with events for women, and Cornell didn't complete.

At a match against Germany in Birmingham in 1930, Cornell set a British record of 5.80 m (19 feet 2.5 inches), becoming the first 19 ft jump by a European. The British record stood for 23 years until 1952. The 1930 Women's World Games in Prague saw Cornell place in second again to Hitomi.

Cornell also competed in sprint and hurdle events, and at the Women's Amateur Athletic Association (AAA) championships she won the 100 m hurdles in 1927, the 100 yards in 1928, and the 80 m hurdles in 1930. In 1928 she broke the world record for the 80 metres hurdles in the semi-final but was beaten in the final itself.

A snapped Achilles tendon in 1934 ended her career as an athlete, however she continued her involvement with the sport. She served as honorary secretary of the Women's Amateur Athletic Association for 11
years, and was organising secretary for the Women's World Games and women's events at the Empire Games both staged in London in 1934. She also managed the women's team at the 1936 Summer Olympics in Berlin and helped to establish a national coaching scheme after World War II.

Cornell died of pneumonia on 8 March 1996 in Redhill, Surrey. She was posthumously inducted into the England Athletics Hall of Fame in 2014.

References

1906 births
1996 deaths
People from Mitcham
Athletes from London
English female long jumpers
English female sprinters
British female long jumpers
British female sprinters
Women's World Games medalists
World record setters in athletics (track and field)